Chengzhan (a.k.a. City Station) or Hangzhou Railway Station is a station on Line 1 and Line 5 of the Hangzhou Metro in China. It is located by Hangzhou railway station. It was opened in November 2012, together with the rest of the stations on Line 1. Line 5 was opened on 23 April 2020, which also pass this station. It is located in the Shangcheng District of Hangzhou.

References

Railway stations in Zhejiang
Railway stations in China opened in 2012
Hangzhou Metro stations